Julien Vermote (born 26 July 1989) is a Belgian professional cyclist, who currently rides for UCI ProTeam . His brother is Alphonse Vermote, who rode for the  squad. He was named in the start list for the 2015 Tour de France.

Juniors
Born in Kortrijk, Flanders, Belgium, Vermote started racing at a young age and joined the KSV Deerlijk team in 2002 and stayed on that team for the rest of his junior career. He was the national champion in the novice category in 2004. Going through the years, Vermote had results on all levels and his time trialling skills started to develop with multiple wins in the discipline. In his final year in the junior ranks, he won 10 races including Ledegem-Kemmel-Ledegem and a 2nd place in the junior's Ronde van Vlaanderen.

Beveren 2000/Under-23
In his first year in the Under-23 ranks, Vermote came up with a huge win in the time trial in the Le Tryptique des Monts et Chateaux over multiple strong time trialists in Jan Bakelants and Jan Ghyselinck.

In his 2nd year in the Under-23 ranks, Vermote kept pulling very strong results. He shocked the field in the Under-23 Belgian Time Trial Championships with beating defending champion Ghyselinck (who finished in 4th) and won by 23 seconds. He had another strong time trialing result with winning the stage 2 time trial in the Tour du Haut Anjou beating Under-23 stalwarts Tejay van Garderen and Marcel Kittel. He hung on for 2nd place overall in the stage race just 4 seconds behind van Garderen.

2010 was a solid year for Vermote though in some peoples eyes, not as strong as his previous U-23 years. He had multiple strong results in big Under-23 races such as the Ronde Van Vlaanderen Beloften (12th), La Cote de Picardie (4th) and Triptyque des Monts et Chateaux (7th overall) though he had one great win in Brussel-Opwijk, breaking away solo and winning alone.

Private life
Vermote is Roman Catholic and gave testimonial in different Schools, he says the rosary gives him strengths during his career as sportsman. He lives in Stasegem, outside Harelbeke, Flanders.

Major results

2006
 3rd Time trial, National Junior Road Championships
2008
 1st Stage 2 (ITT) Le Triptyque des Monts et Châteaux
2009
 1st  Time trial, National Under-23 Road Championships
 2nd Overall Tour du Haut-Anjou
1st Stage 2 (ITT)
 8th Ronde van Vlaanderen U23
2010
 3rd Zellik–Galmaarden
 3rd Grand Prix Criquielion
 4th La Côte Picarde
 6th Circuit de Wallonie
 7th Overall Le Triptyque des Monts et Châteaux
2012
 1st  Overall Driedaagse van West-Vlaanderen
1st  Young rider classification
2013
 1st GP Briek Schotte
 3rd Time trial, National Road Championships
 3rd Duo Normand (with Kristof Vandewalle)
2014
 1st Stage 7 Tour of Britain
 3rd  Team time trial, UCI Road World Championships
 5th Omloop van het Houtland
 8th Brabantse Pijl
2015
 8th Overall Three Days of De Panne
2016
 1st  Team time trial, UCI Road World Championships
 1st Textielprijs Vichte
 9th Overall Tour of Britain
1st Stage 2
2017
 2nd Gullegem Koerse
 5th Overall Tour of Belgium
2018
 8th Grand Prix d'Isbergues
 9th Kuurne–Brussels–Kuurne
2019
 10th Paris–Tours

Grand Tour general classification results timeline

References

External links

 

1989 births
Belgian male cyclists
Belgian Roman Catholics
Living people
Sportspeople from Kortrijk
Cyclists from West Flanders